Trio is an album by Polish jazz pianist and composer Marcin Wasilewski recorded in 2004 and released on the ECM label.

Reception
The Allmusic review by Thom Jurek awarded the album 4 stars stating "While none of these men are flashy as soloists, they are seriously accomplished jazzmen with advanced ability to hang with anyone. They have the goods, the ideas, and the method. When playing together, they can literally astonish because they make it all sound so easy. It's been a few years since a piano trio's debut has literally sung, but this one does so unceasingly. It has color and space and drama and beauty in spades".

Track listing
All compositions by Marcin Wasilewski, Slawomir Kurkiewicz and Michal Miskiewicz except where noted.

 "Trio Conversation (Introduction)" - 2:47 
 "Hyperballad" (Björk) - 5:55 
 "Roxana's Song" (Karol Szymanowski) - 4:27 
 "K.T.C." (Wasilewski) - 6:22 
 "Plaza Real" (Wayne Shorter) - 5:55 
 "Shine" (Wasilewski) - 6:04 
 "Green Sky" (Tomasz Stańko) - 6:52 
 "Sister's Song" (Ewa Wasilewska, Wasilewski) - 6:02 
 "Drum Kick" - 1:45 
 "Free-Bop" (Wasilewski) - 4:34 
 "Free Combinations for Three Instruments" - 4:56 
 "Entropy" - 5:53 
 "Trio Conversation (The End)" - 2:01

Personnel
Marcin Wasilewski - piano
Slawomir Kurkiewicz - bass
Michal Miskiewicz - drums

References

External links 
Marcin Wasilewski Trio at culture.pl

ECM Records albums
2005 albums
Albums produced by Manfred Eicher
Marcin Wasilewski (pianist) albums